San Rafael is a district of the Oreamuno canton, in the Cartago province of Costa Rica.

Geography 
San Rafael has an area of  km² and an elevation of  metres.

Demographics 

For the 2011 census, San Rafael had a population of  inhabitants.

Transportation

Road transportation 
The district is covered by the following road routes:
 National Route 10
 National Route 219
 National Route 233

Rail transportation 
The Interurbano Line operated by Incofer goes through this district.

References 

Districts of Cartago Province
Populated places in Cartago Province